The RA-1 Military Free-Fall Advanced Ram-Air Parachute System (MFF ARAPS) provides a multi-mission, high-altitude parachute delivery system that allows personnel to exit at altitudes between 3,500 feet and 35,000 feet. The parachute, which replaces the current MC-4 parachute, supports a total jumper weight of 450 pounds. It also provides non-MFF personnel with a ram-air parachute that is static-line deployed.

The ARAPS’ three accessory systems are at different stages of the acquisition process:
 The Electronic Automatic Activation Device (EAAD) is used with current and next-generation parachute systems, replacing the Automatic Ripcord Release. EADD provides a simpler and more reliable method of activation in the event the parachutist is unable to deploy the parachute at the appropriate altitude. The EAAD activates and cuts the reserve parachute closing loops if the jumper is falling at 78 mph or faster at the minimum deployment altitude.
 The Navigation Aid (NAVAID) will provide in-flight navigation and mission planning capability, allowing parachutists under canopy to locate themselves and the intended drop zone easily. The system uses a GPS that integrates with the Mission Planner of the Joint Precision Airdrop System (MP JPADS), ensuring more accurate canopy flight and drop zone landings.
 The Parachutist Oxygen Mask (POM) will provide supplemental oxygen at 13,000 feet and higher and will be easier to use and maintain than the current MBU-12P mask. The POM will not interfere with the parachutist’s vision or range of motion.

See also
 Military Freefall Parachutist Badge
 United States Army Parachute Team – Golden Knights
 United States Army Maneuver Center of Excellence Command Exhibition Parachute Team – Silver Wings
 United States Special Operations Command Parachute Team - Para-Commandos

References

Military equipment of the United States
Military parachutes